John Gunion Rutherford  (December 25, 1857 – July 24, 1923) was a Canadian veterinarian, civil servant, and politician.

Born in Mountain Cross, Newlands Parish, Peeblesshire, Scotland, the son of Rev. Robert Rutherford, Rutherford was educated at the High
School in Glasgow and by private tuition. He emigrated to Canada in 1875 and took a course at the Ontario Agricultural College and afterwards attended the Ontario Veterinary College, graduating in 1879 with the rank of gold medalist. Settling in Portage la Prairie, Manitoba, he was President of the Manitoba Liberal Printing Company and the owner of a large veterinary infirmary. During the North-West Rebellion in 1885, Rutherford served with the Winnipeg Field Battery as a Veterinary Surgeon, and was present at the engagements of Fish Creek and Batoche, for which he received the medal and clasp.

In 1892, he was elected to the Legislative Assembly of Manitoba for the electoral district of Lakeside. A Manitoba Liberal, he served until 1896. He was elected to the House of Commons of Canada in an 1897 by-election for the electoral district of Macdonald. A Liberal, he was defeated in 1900. He was appointed Dominion Veterinary Director-General in 1902 and Dominion Livestock Commissioner in 1906. In 1912, he was appointed Superintendent of Agriculture and Animal Industry for the Canadian Pacific Railway.

He was president of the American Veterinary Medical Association from 1908 to 1909. From 1918 until his death in 1923, he was a Board of Railway Commissioner and Transport Commissioner.

He was appointed CMG in the 1910 Birthday Honours.

References
 Personnel of the Senate and House of Commons, eighth Parliament of Canada, elected June 23, 1896
 
 John Gunion Rutherford - A Famous Manitoba Veterinarian
 John Gunion Rutherford at The Canadian Encyclopedia
 Board of Railway Commissioners and Transport Commissioners

1857 births
1923 deaths
Liberal Party of Canada MPs
Manitoba Liberal Party MLAs
Members of the House of Commons of Canada from Manitoba
Scottish emigrants to Canada
People from the Scottish Borders
Canadian Companions of the Order of St Michael and St George
Canadian veterinarians
Male veterinarians